Marius Müller is the name of:

 Marius Müller (musician) (1958–1999), Norwegian guitarist, vocalist, songwriter and record producer
 Marius Müller (footballer, born 1990), German football midfielder
 Marius Müller (footballer, born 1993), German footballer goalkeeper

See also
 Marius Müller-Westernhagen (born 1948), German singer and actor